Alexey Leonidovich Shebarshin (born 1959 in Russia) is a Russian politician and diplomat. He is the current Russian Ambassador to the Federal Republic of Nigeria. He was appointed by President Vladimir Putin in 2018.

Education and career 
Shebarshin attended the Moscow State Institute of International Relations, a diplomatic school of the Ministry of Foreign Affairs where he graduated to be an Ambassador in 1982. In 1982 he began his diplomatic career in the Russia's Foreign Affairs Ministry. In 2001, he was appointed the Russian governments and International Relations top manager for Gazprom.

In 2005, while still serving as International relations manager, he was appointed Russian Ambassador to Sri Lanka and Maldives. He served as High commissioner in Sri Lanka and Maldives till 2008.

On 20 April 2018, Shebarshin was appointed Russian Ambassador to Nigeria by President Vladimir Putin.

References 

1959 births
Living people
Moscow State Institute of International Relations alumni
Ambassador Extraordinary and Plenipotentiary (Russian Federation)
Ambassadors of Russia to Nigeria
Ambassadors of Russia to Sri Lanka
Ambassadors of Russia to the Maldives